LPG/C Ayame is a Very Large Gas Carrier (VLGC), with a capacity of , delivered in 2010 from MHI Ltd. of Nagasaki, and under the management of Wilhelmsen Lines Malaysia.

Ship history
On 30 April 2010 the LPG carrier Ayame was completed at the Mitsubishi Heavy Industries Nagasaki Shipyard. A naming ceremony was held on 22 April at the shipyard, with guests including Ikuhiro Ochi, President/Managing Director of the shipowner. Mitsui O.S.K. Lines Managing Executive Officer Tsuneo Watanabe, who named the vessel, and Astomos Energy Corporation Senior Managing Director Tatsuhiko Yamazaki, who cut the rope.

The Ayame is the third 83,000m3-class LPG carrier ordered from MHI. The first, the Musanah, was delivered on 4 December 2009, and the second, the Aquamarine Progress, on 15 January 2010. Upon its launching, the Ayama was assigned to an LPG carrier pool operated by LPG Global Transport Management Inc. and left on its maiden voyage to load cargo in the Middle East.

Common Route: – Japan – Singapore – Indonesia – Ruwais

See also
Gas carrier
Mitsui O.S.K. Lines
LNG carrier
Liquefied petroleum gas
List of tankers
Shipping

References

External links
Mitsui O.S.K. Lines Press Release 27 January 2009
Vessels Position
Ayame Photos
WSM takes over management LPG/C Ayame 13 May 2010
Vessel Details
Nippon Kaiji Kyokai

2010 ships
Ayame
Tankers
Ships of Singapore
Merchant ships of Singapore